Fan Death was a synthpop band formed in Brooklyn, New York City, in 2007 as a collaboration between producer Szam Findlay with vocalists Dandilion Wind Opaine (Dandi Wind) and Marta Jaciubek-McKeever. Findlay then moved to Vancouver, British Columbia, where the lineup changed to Findlay and sisters Kasia Elizabeth and Tessa Marie as vocalists. The band is named after the South Korean notion that suggests that sleeping in an enclosed room with an electric fan running can cause asphyxiation.

In 2008, Erol Alkan remixed and released their debut single "Veronica's Veil" on his Phantasy Sounds label. The following year, Tokyo-based independent label Big Love Records released the EP Cannibal featuring remixes from CFCF and Manderson. 

Fan Death played shows with Florence and the Machine, Ellie Goulding, Metronomy, Telepathe, Late of the Pier and Franz Ferdinand, as well as at the Afisha Picnic in Moscow. The band was featured in international magazines such as the NME, The Fader, Nylon, The Guardian, Dazed & Confused and on the cover of Italian fashion magazine Pig surrounded by naked men.

Also in 2009, Fan Death remixed songs by artists such as Ladyhawke, Frankmusik, The Virgins, Lindstrom, Lost Valentinos and Datarock. The band supported Vampire Weekend on the European leg of their world tour and released their album Womb of Dreams in the UK on August 30, 2010. Following this tour, the band dissolved. In August 2011, the official Fan Death website (defunct) announced the 2012 release of a new EP titled Awakenings, but it did not materialize.

Discography

Studio albums
 Womb of Dreams (2010)

Extended plays
 Cannibal (2009)
 A Coin for the Well (2010)

Singles
 Veronica's Veil (2008)
 Reunited (2009)

References

External links
 
 

2007 establishments in New York City
American synth-pop groups
Canadian electronic music groups
Electronic music groups from New York (state)
Italo disco groups
Musical groups established in 2007
Musical groups from Brooklyn
Musical groups from Vancouver
American musical trios
Nu-disco musicians
Canadian musical trios